Hemant Chauhan is an Indian writer and singer associated with Gujarati literature and music. He was born on 7 November 1955 in Kundni village in Rajkot district of Gujarat. He specializes in Bhajan, religious and Garba songs and other folk genres.

On 9 October 2012, he received the 'Akademi Ratna Award 2011' for his contributions to Gujarat's traditional folk music. He is frequently referred to as the Bhajan King of Gujarati Music, and is also considered to be one of the best singers of Sugam Sangeet. He has a huge fan base and following all over the world including India (mainly in Gujarat), United Arab Emirates, United Kingdom, United States and East Africa. His fan base outside India is made up of people of Gujarati heritage. With an extensive catalogue of hit songs and bhajans, his “Kathiya Wadi Lok Dayra and Bhajan Sandhya” concert tour in North America in early 2007 was a huge hit. He has released many albums of devotional music. He has the mastery in Gujarati Bhajans and he himself believes that he has gained popularity and fame by singing Gujarati Bhajans, especially the Bhajans of great Gujarati saint-poet Dasi Jivan. His first album 'Dasi Jivan na Bhajano' was released in 1978 and became a huge hit across Gujarat. Since then, he has sung more than 5000 bhajans and many other devotional items.

Selected works

 Bharat no Bhimrao (Dr. B R Ambedkar)
 Bandharan kon lakhe (Dr. B R Ambedkar)
Pankhida O Pankhida
Om Namah Shivay - Shiv Dhun
Shriman Narayan Narayan - Vishnu Dhun
Hey Ram Hey Ram Dhun
Om Mangalam Omkar Mangalam Dhun
Om Mangalam Omkar Mangalam - Dwadash Jyotirling Song
Bhajman Bam Bam Bholenath
Stuti Namo Bhootnath
Om Sai Mangalam
Laher Lagi Bhajan Ni
Dham Dham Nagara Re...
Live In Leicester - Tu Rangai Jane Rang Ma
Chotile Dakla Vagya
Bhajan-Krishna-Devotional
Shiv Tandav
He Jagjanani He Jagdamba Hd Verslkion
Hemant Chauhan - Tare Rahevu Bhada Na Makan Ma...
Shrinathaji And Bhajan
Pankhida Ne Aa Pinjaru
Unchi Medi Te Mara Sant Ni Re
Raakh Na Ramakada
O Ma Meri
 Pyalo mein pidhel che bharpoor (Sant Dasi Jivan)
 Dekhanda koi aa dal mai (Sant Dasi Jivan)
 Kaleja katari, madi mune laine maari (Sant Dasi Jivan)

References

External links
 Interview of Hemant Chauhan by Devang Vibhakar on speakbindas 
 Short Introduction of Hemant Chauhan on planetradiocity
 

Indian male singer-songwriters
Indian singer-songwriters
Living people
Indian male folk singers
Performers of Hindu music
Bhajan singers
Gujarati-language writers
Gujarati-language singers
Singers from Gujarat
Year of birth missing (living people)
Recipients of the Sangeet Natak Akademi Award
Recipients of the Padma Shri in arts